John William Humphries (June 23, 1915 – June 24, 1965) was a pitcher in Major League Baseball from 1938 to 1946. Born in Clifton Forge, Virginia, he played for the Cleveland Indians, Chicago White Sox, and Philadelphia Phillies. Humphries played college baseball at North Carolina. When Humphries made his Major League debut with the Indians in 1938, he was thought to have the best fastball in the American League. He made 45 pitching appearances as a rookie in 1938 to lead the American League, beating out Bobo Newsom of the St. Louis Browns by one. Between July 13 and July 26, 1942, Humphries pitched ten or more innings in four consecutive starts. , no other pitcher had ever pitched more than nine innings in more than three consecutive appearances.

He died in 1965 in New Orleans, Louisiana.

References

External links

1915 births
1965 deaths
People from Clifton Forge, Virginia
Major League Baseball pitchers
Cleveland Indians players
Chicago White Sox players
Philadelphia Phillies players
New Orleans Pelicans (baseball) players
Baseball players from Virginia